Purcăreț may refer to several villages in Romania:

 Purcăreți, a village in Pianu Commune, Alba County
 Purcărete, a village in Negrilești Commune, Bistrița-Năsăud County
 Purcăreț, a village in Letca Commune, Sălaj County